Daniel Rezende (born May 5, 1975) is a Brazilian film editor and director. He won the BAFTA Award for Best Editing for his work on the 2002 film City of God and was also nominated for an Academy Award for Best Film Editing for the same film. City of God was listed as the 17th best-edited film of all time in a 2012 survey of members of the Motion Picture Editors Guild.
In a 2003 interview to Channel 4, Rezende has described the editing process of City of God, saying he tried to "provoke differing sensations in each of the film's phases". In addition to the international nominations and awards received for City of God, Rezende's editing has frequently been recognized by regional awards in his native Brazil and in Argentina. Rezende has also given a master editing class at the prestigious international film school  EICTV in 2011.

In 2017, Rezende made his debut as film director with Bingo: The King of the Mornings (Bingo: O Rei das Manhãs).

Filmography

Editor 
 2002 - Armas e Paz (Walter Salles and Daniela Thomas)
 2002 - City of God (Fernando Meirelles)
 2003 - Narradores de Javé (Eliane Caffé)
 2004 - The Motorcycle Diaries (Walter Salles)
 2005 - Dark Water (Walter Salles)
 2006 - The Year My Parents Went on Vacation (Cao Hamburger)
 2007 - Elite Squad (José Padilha)
 2007 - City of Men (Paulo Morelli)
 2008 - Blindness  (Fernando Meirelles)
 2010 - As Melhores Coisas do Mundo (Laís Bodanzky)
 2010 - Elite Squad: The Enemy Within (José Padilha)
 2011 - The Tree of Life (Terrence Malick)
 2011 - 360  (Fernando Meirelles)
 2014 - RoboCop (José Padilha)
 2018 - Entebbe (José Padilha)

Director 
 2017 - Bingo: The King of the Mornings
 2019 - Monica and Friends: Bonds
 2019 - Nobody's Looking

See also
List of film director and editor collaborations

References

External links
 

1975 births
Living people
Best Editing BAFTA Award winners
Brazilian film editors